Rapax Team was an Italian motor racing team. The team's history can be traced back to when the GP Racing team was founded in 1997, and also to when Piquet Sports was created in 2000 by triple world champion Nelson Piquet. In 2007, Piquet Sports and GP Racing merged to create "Minardi Piquet Sports". In 2008, the team dropped "Minardi" from their name. In early 2009, the team was sold and rebranded as Piquet GP, but changed its name again in November to Rapax Team, once all remaining ties to part-owner Piquet were cut.

History
During 2009, the team was sold and all remaining ties with part-owner Nelson Piquet were severed. The team was rebranded "Rapax" (Latin for "predator") at the beginning of 2010, after the Legio XXI Rapax Roman legion. Pastor Maldonado rejoined the team, alongside Luiz Razia. Maldonado won six races on his way to the drivers' championship, and Razia backed him up with 11th place overall, allowing Rapax to win the teams' championship for the first time, and in the first year of its new identity.

For 2011, Maldonado graduated to Formula One with the Williams team and Razia moved to the new Caterham Team AirAsia; Rapax signed Fabio Leimer and Julián Leal to replace them. Leimer won a single race but was unable build on it, restricting him to fourteenth place in the drivers' championship, whilst Leal did not score at all; Rapax dropped to tenth in the teams' championship.

In 2012, the team improved to ninth overall through the combined efforts of Tom Dillmann, Stefano Coletti, Ricardo Teixeira and Daniël de Jong. Dillmann was the most successful with a single victory, but was dropped for budgetary reasons mid-season and replaced by De Jong. De Jong's Auto GP racing commitments also resulted in him missing the final two races of the championship, for which he was replaced by Scuderia Coloni refugee Coletti. By contrast, Teixeira competed in all but one round of the season, but failed to score any points.

For 2013 the team kept Coletti and signed with Simon Trummer. Coletti took three race wins and improved to the fifth place in the standings. While Trummer had six point-scoring finishes on his way to the 20th place in the driver standings.

Trummer was retained for the 2014 GP2 Series. He was joined by Adrian Quaife-Hobbs. The team had suffered a weak season, with just one podium that Quaife-Hobbs had collected.

The team had completely changed their line-up for the 2015 GP2 Series, signing with Sergey Sirotkin and Robert Vișoiu. The team had scored its first win since 2013 Monaco round with Sirotkin in the 2015 Silverstone round. Sirotkin was also the first Rapax driver since Maldonado who had finished in the top-three in the driver standings with the team. For the last two rounds of the season Visoiu was replaced by Gustav Malja.

Malja remained with the team for the full 2016 GP2 Series campaign. Arthur Pic completed the team line-up. Malja had podiums at Spa and Monza, while Pic finished on podium at Hockenheimring. Pic was replaced by Johnny Cecotto Jr. in the two final rounds. Rapax ended ninth in the team standings.

In , the GP2 Series was rebranded to FIA Formula 2 Championship. The team had started the season with Cecotto and Nyck de Vries. De Vries won the Sprint Monaco F2 race — the first race win for the Rapax since Sirotkin in 2015. At Spielberg Cecotto was replaced by Sergio Canamasas. Rapax field two new drivers at Spa, signing with Louis Delétraz and Roberto Merhi. René Binder had a one-off round appearance for Rapax at Jerez. Despite not having a permanent driver line-up, results shown by De Vries helped the team to achieve fifth place in the teams standings — the highest position since they took the teams' championship back in 2010. But the team decided to stop their racing activity and leave the FIA Formula 2 Championship.

Results

GP2 Series

FIA Formula 2 Championship

† Shared his position and results with another team.

GP2 Series 
(key) (Races in bold indicate pole position) (Races in italics indicate fastest lap)

FIA Formula 2 Championship
(key) (Races in bold indicate pole position) (Races in italics indicate fastest lap)

Notes and references

External links

 Official website

Italian auto racing teams
GP2 Series teams
Auto racing teams established in 2010
2010 establishments in Italy
FIA Formula 2 Championship teams
Auto racing teams disestablished in 2017